Strophostyles helvola, commonly called amberique-bean, annual sand bean, or trailing fuzzybean is a species of flowering plant in the legume family. It is native to eastern Canada and the eastern United States.

Description
It is an annual to perennial herbaceous vine, up to 3 m long, with light pubescence on the stem, leaves, and pods. The trifoliate leaves are often divided into three lobes, in a fiddle-shape (panduriform). They possess unique pea-like pink-purple flowers (fading to cream-yellow), with a gradually curving keel petal (the keel petal is one of the most distinguishing characters among the species of the genus). The fruit of S. helvola is up to 10 cm long, containing shiny black seeds with hairy coats originating from the inner surface of the pods. This seed coating lends the seeds buoyancy in water, which is thought to have contributed to its dispersal along major aquatic routes.

Strophostyles helvola is primarily diagnosed by its keel petal (prominent, thin, curving away from the banner at the distal end); long, cylindrical pods; and highly lobed leaves (though not always lobed, and Strophostyles umbellata may also show lobing).

When the seed pods are mature, they burst open to release the seeds.

Taxonomy
In addition to the type, at least one infraspecific taxon has been recognized, S. helvola var. missouriensis (S. Watson) Britton, although there is little evidence for distinct varieties of this species.

A widely used orthographic variant is Strophostyles helvula, although only the former is taxonomically accepted.

Agricultural relevance 
Strophostyles helvola is a wild relative of the cultivated common bean (Phaseolus vulgaris), and could serve as an important model for understanding how herbaceous legumes adapt to different stressful environments. Specifically, S. helvola has coastal populations which show high salinity tolerance due to up-regulated genes.

Distribution and habitat 
It is native to eastern Canada and the eastern United States. This bean grows in many habitat types, including disturbed areas, where it is a pioneer species, taking hold in areas where few other plants grow, and in several types of soil, especially sandy types, and it can grow in dry or moist conditions. It can often be found in seaside dune habitat, where arbuscular mycorrhizae help it withstand saline conditions.

Ethnobotany 
This plant was used medicinally and as food by Native American peoples. The Houma people used it to treat typhoid and the Iroquois used it topically for poison ivy irritation and warts. The Choctaw people used the boiled, mashed roots for food. Discovery of large quantities of S. helvola seeds in archaeological sites also suggests a use similar to common bean at one time; though the seeds are smaller than cultivated bean, it is nutritionally similar and possesses the largest seeds and pods for the genus. The pods have been used in the present day as a sauteed vegetable in South Central Mindanao, Philippines.

References

Phaseoleae
Flora of Eastern Canada
Flora of the Northeastern United States
Flora of the Southeastern United States
Flora of the North-Central United States
Flora of the South-Central United States